The Eclipse 6.7, also called the Northbridge Eclipse, is an American trailerable sailboat that was designed by Carl Alberg as a cruiser and first built in 1978.

The design is a development of the South Coast 22, which was in turn based upon Alberg's South Coast 21 design. The Eclipse differs from the South Coast 22 by moving the mast  forward, plus changes to the coach house roof, cockpit and the interior.

Production
The design was built by South Coast Seacraft in United States, starting in 1978, but it is now out of production.

Design
The Eclipse 6.7 is a recreational keelboat, built predominantly of fiberglass, with wood trim. It has a masthead sloop rig, a spooned raked stem, an angled transom, a transom-hung rudder controlled by a tiller and a swing keel. It displaces  and carries  of ballast.

The boat is normally fitted with a small outboard motor for docking and maneuvering.

Operational history
The boat is supported by an active class club that organizes racing events, the South Coast Seacraft Owners' Association.

See also
List of sailing boat types

References

Keelboats
1980s sailboat type designs
Sailing yachts
Trailer sailers
Sailboat type designs by Carl Alberg
Sailboat types built by South Coast Seacraft